Matatiele is a town located in the northern part of the Eastern Cape Province of South Africa.

Matatiele may also refer to:
 Matatiele Local Municipality, municipality located in the Alfred Nzo District of Eastern Cape
 Matatiele Stadium, multi-use stadium in Matatiele
 Matatiele (TV series), television drama series